Asa Philip Randolph (April 15, 1889 – May 16, 1979) was an American labor unionist and civil rights activist. In 1925, he organized and led the Brotherhood of Sleeping Car Porters, the first successful African-American led labor union. In the early Civil Rights Movement and the Labor Movement, Randolph was a prominent voice. His continuous agitation with the support of fellow labor rights activists against racist unfair labor practices, eventually helped lead President Franklin D. Roosevelt to issue Executive Order 8802 in 1941, banning discrimination in the defense industries during World War II. The group then successfully maintained pressure, so that President Harry S. Truman proposed a new Civil Rights Act and issued Executive Orders 9980 and 9981 in 1948, promoting fair employment, anti-discrimination policies in federal government hiring, and ending racial segregation in the armed services.

Randolph was born and raised in Florida. Although he was able to attain a good education in his community at Cookman Institute, he did not see a future for himself in the discriminatory Jim Crow era south, and moved to New York City just before the Great Migration.  There he became convinced that overcoming racism required collective action and he was drawn to socialism and workers' rights. He unsuccessfully ran for state office on the socialist ticket in the early twenties, but found more success in organizing for African American workers' rights.

In 1963, Randolph was the head of the March on Washington, which was organized by Bayard Rustin, at which Reverend Martin Luther King Jr. delivered his "I Have A Dream" speech. Randolph inspired the "Freedom Budget", sometimes called the "Randolph Freedom budget", which aimed to deal with the economic problems facing the black community, it was published by the Randolph Institute in January 1967 as "A Freedom Budget for All Americans".

Biography

Early life and education
Asa Philip Randolph was born April 15, 1889, in Crescent City, Florida, the second son of James William Randolph, a tailor and minister in an African Methodist Episcopal Church, and Elizabeth Robinson Randolph, a skilled seamstress. In 1891, the family moved to Jacksonville, Florida, which had a thriving, well-established African-American community.

From his father, Randolph learned that color was less important than a person's character and conduct. From his mother, he learned the importance of education and of defending oneself physically against those who would seek to hurt one or one's family, if necessary. Randolph remembered vividly the night his mother sat in the front room of their house with a loaded shotgun across her lap, while his father tucked a pistol under his coat and went off to prevent a mob from lynching a man at the local county jail.

Asa and his brother, James, were superior students. They attended the Cookman Institute in East Jacksonville, the only academic high school in Florida for African Americans. Asa excelled in literature, drama, and public speaking; he also starred on the school's baseball team, sang solos with the school choir, and was valedictorian of the 1907 graduating class.

After graduation, Randolph worked odd jobs and devoted his time to singing, acting, and reading. Reading W. E. B. Du Bois' The Souls of Black Folk convinced him that the fight for social equality was most important. Barred by discrimination from all but manual jobs in the South, Randolph moved to New York City in 1911, where he worked at odd jobs and took social sciences courses at City College.

Marriage and family
In 1913, Randolph courted and married Lucille Campbell Green, a widow, Howard University graduate, and entrepreneur who shared his socialist politics. She earned enough money to support them both. The couple had no children.

Early career
Shortly after Randolph's marriage, he helped organize the Shakespearean Society in Harlem. With them he played the roles of Hamlet, Othello, and Romeo, among others. Randolph aimed to become an actor but gave up after failing to win his parents' approval.In New York, Randolph became familiar with socialism and the ideologies espoused by the Industrial Workers of the World. He met Columbia University Law student Chandler Owen, and the two developed a synthesis of Marxist economics and the sociological ideas of Lester Frank Ward, arguing that people could only be free if not subject to economic deprivation. At this point, Randolph developed what would become his distinctive form of civil rights activism, which emphasized the importance of collective action as a way for black people to gain legal and economic equality. To this end, he and Owen opened an employment office in Harlem to provide job training for southern migrants and encourage them to join trade unions.

Like others in the labor movement, Randolph favored immigration restriction. He opposed African Americans' having to compete with people willing to work for low wages. Unlike other immigration restrictionists, however, he rejected the notions of racial hierarchy that became popular in the 1920s.

In 1917, Randolph and Chandler Owen founded The Messenger with the help of the Socialist Party of America. It was a radical monthly magazine, which campaigned against lynching, opposed U.S. participation in World War I, urged African Americans to resist being drafted, to fight for an integrated society, and urged them to join radical unions. The Department of Justice called The Messenger "the most able and the most dangerous of all the Negro publications." When The Messenger began publishing the work of black poets and authors, a critic called it "one of the most brilliantly edited magazines in the history of Negro journalism."

Soon thereafter, however, the editorial staff of The Messenger became divided by three issues – the growing rift between West Indian and African Americans, support for the Bolshevik revolution, and support for Marcus Garvey's Back-to-Africa movement. In 1919, most West Indian radicals joined the new Communist Party, while African-American leftists – Randolph included – mostly supported the Socialist Party. The infighting left The Messenger short of financial support, and it went into decline.

Randolph ran on the Socialist Party ticket for New York State Comptroller in 1920, and for Secretary of State of New York in 1922, unsuccessfully.

Union organizer

Randolph's first experience with labor organization came in 1917, when he organized a union of elevator operators in New York City. In 1919 he became president of the National Brotherhood of Workers of America, a union which organized among African-American shipyard and dock workers in the Tidewater region of Virginia. The union dissolved in 1921, under pressure from the American Federation of Labor.

His greatest success came with the Brotherhood of Sleeping Car Porters (BSCP), who elected him president in 1925. This was the first serious effort to form a labor institution for employees of the Pullman Company, which was a major employer of African Americans. The railroads had expanded dramatically in the early 20th century, and the jobs offered relatively good employment at a time of widespread racial discrimination. Because porters were not unionized, however, most suffered poor working conditions and were underpaid.

Under Randolph's direction, the BSCP managed to enroll 51 percent of porters within a year, to which Pullman responded with violence and firings. In 1928, after failing to win mediation under the Watson-Parker Railway Labor Act, Randolph planned a strike. This was postponed after rumors circulated that Pullman had 5,000 replacement workers ready to take the place of BSCP members. As a result of its perceived ineffectiveness, membership of the union declined; by 1933 it had only 658 members and electricity and telephone service at headquarters had been disconnected because of nonpayment of bills.

Fortunes of the BSCP changed with the election of President Franklin D. Roosevelt in 1932. With amendments to the Railway Labor Act in 1934, porters were granted rights under federal law. Membership in the Brotherhood jumped to more than 7,000. After years of bitter struggle, the Pullman Company finally began to negotiate with the Brotherhood in 1935, and agreed to a contract with them in 1937. Employees gained $2,000,000 in pay increases, a shorter workweek, and overtime pay. Randolph maintained the Brotherhood's affiliation with the American Federation of Labor through the 1955 AFL-CIO merger.

Civil rights leader

Through his success with the BSCP, Randolph emerged as one of the most visible spokespeople for African-American civil rights. In 1941, he, Bayard Rustin, and A. J. Muste proposed a march on Washington to protest racial discrimination in war industries, an end to segregation, access to defense employment, the proposal of an anti-lynching law and of the desegregation of the American Armed forces. Randolph's belief in the power of peaceful direct action was inspired partly by Mahatma Gandhi's success in using such tactics against British occupation in India. Randolph threatened to have 50,000 blacks march on the city; it was cancelled after President of the United States Franklin D. Roosevelt issued Executive Order 8802, or the Fair Employment Act. Some activists, including Rustin, felt betrayed because Roosevelt's order applied only to banning discrimination within war industries and not the armed forces. Nonetheless, the Fair Employment Act is generally considered an important early civil rights victory.

And the movement continued to gain momentum. In 1942, an estimated 18,000 blacks gathered at Madison Square Garden to hear Randolph kick off a campaign against discrimination in the military, in war industries, in government agencies, and in labor unions. Following passage of the Act, during the Philadelphia transit strike of 1944, the government backed African-American workers' striking to gain positions formerly limited to white employees.

Buoyed by these successes, Randolph and other activists continued to press for the rights of African Americans. In 1947, Randolph, along with colleague Grant Reynolds, renewed efforts to end discrimination in the armed services, forming the Committee Against Jim Crow in Military Service, later renamed the League for Non-Violent Civil disobedience. When President Truman asked Congress for a peacetime draft law, Randolph urged young black men to refuse to register. Since Truman was vulnerable to defeat in 1948 and needed the support of the growing black population in northern states, he eventually capitulated. On July 26, 1948, President Harry S. Truman abolished racial segregation in the armed forces through Executive Order 9981.

In 1950, along with Roy Wilkins, Executive Secretary of the NAACP, and, Arnold Aronson, a leader of the National Jewish Community Relations Advisory Council, Randolph founded the Leadership Conference on Civil Rights (LCCR). LCCR has been a major civil rights coalition. It coordinated a national legislative campaign on behalf of every major civil rights law since 1957.
Randolph and Rustin also formed an important alliance with Martin Luther King Jr. In 1957, when schools in the south resisted school integration following Brown v. Board of Education, Randolph organized the Prayer Pilgrimage for Freedom with Martin Luther King Jr. In 1958 and 1959, Randolph organized Youth Marches for Integrated Schools in Washington, D.C. At the same time, he arranged for Rustin to teach King how to organize peaceful demonstrations in Alabama and to form alliances with progressive whites. The protests directed by James Bevel in cities such as Birmingham and Montgomery provoked a violent backlash by police and the local Ku Klux Klan throughout the summer of 1963, which was captured on television and broadcast throughout the nation and the world. Rustin later remarked that Birmingham "was one of television's finest hours. Evening after evening, television brought into the living-rooms of America the violence, brutality, stupidity, and ugliness of {police commissioner} Eugene "Bull" Connor's effort to maintain racial segregation." Partly as a result of the violent spectacle in Birmingham, which was becoming an international embarrassment, the Kennedy administration drafted civil rights legislation aimed at ending Jim Crow once and for all.

Randolph finally realized his vision for a March on Washington for Jobs and Freedom on August 28, 1963, which attracted between 200,000 and 300,000 to the nation's capital. The rally is often remembered as the high-point of the Civil Rights Movement, and it did help keep the issue in the public consciousness. However, when President Kennedy was assassinated three months later, Civil Rights legislation was stalled in the Senate. It was not until the following year, under President Lyndon B. Johnson, that the Civil Rights Act was finally passed. In 1965, the Voting Rights Act was passed. Although King and Bevel rightly deserve great credit for these legislative victories, the importance of Randolph's contributions to the Civil Rights Movement is large.

Religion
Randolph avoided speaking publicly about his religious beliefs to avoid alienating his diverse constituencies. Though he is sometimes identified as an atheist, particularly by his detractors, Randolph identified with the African Methodist Episcopal Church he was raised in. He pioneered the use of prayer protests, which became a key tactic of the civil rights movement. In 1973, he signed the Humanist Manifesto II.

Death
Randolph died in his Manhattan apartment on May 16, 1979. For several years prior to his death, he had a heart condition and high blood pressure. He had no known living relatives, as his wife Lucille had died in 1963, before the March on Washington.

Awards and accolades

 In 1942, the National Association for the Advancement of Colored People awarded Randolph the Spingarn Medal.
 In 1953, the IBPOEW (Black Elks) awarded him their Elijah P. Lovejoy Medal, given "to that American who shall have worked most successfully to advance the cause of human rights, and for the freedom of Negro people."
 On September 14, 1964, President Lyndon B. Johnson presented Randolph with the Presidential Medal of Freedom. 
 In 1967 awarded the Eugene V. Debs Award
 In 1967 awarded the Pacem in Terris Peace and Freedom Award. It was named after a 1963 encyclical letter by Pope John XXIII that calls upon all people of good will to secure peace among all nations.
 Named Humanist of the Year in 1970 by the American Humanist Association.
 Named to the Florida Civil Rights Hall of Fame in January 2014.

Legacy
Randolph had a significant impact on the Civil Rights Movement from the 1930s onward. The Montgomery bus boycott in Alabama was directed by E.D. Nixon, who had been a member of the BSCP and was influenced by Randolph's methods of nonviolent confrontation. Nationwide, the Civil Rights Movement in the 1950s and 1960s used tactics pioneered by Randolph, such as encouraging African Americans to vote as a bloc, mass voter registration, and training activists for nonviolent direct action.

In buildings, streets, and trains

 Amtrak named one of their best sleeping cars, Superliner II Deluxe Sleeper 32503, the "A. Philip Randolph" in his honor.
 A. Philip Randolph Academies of Technology, in Jacksonville, Florida, is named in his honor.
 A. Philip Randolph Boulevard in Jacksonville, Florida, formerly named Florida Avenue, was renamed in 1995 in A. Philip Randolph's honor. It is located on Jacksonville's east side, near TIAA Bank Field.
A. Philip Randolph Heritage Park in Jacksonville, Florida.
 A. Philip Randolph Campus High School (New York City High School 540), located on the City College of New York campus, is named in honor of Randolph. The school serves students predominantly from Harlem and surrounding neighborhoods.
 Randolph Technical High School in Philadelphia, Pennsylvania was named in his honor.
 The A. Philip Randolph Career and Technician Center in Detroit, Michigan is named in his honor.
 The A. Philip Randolph Institute is named in his honor.
 PS 76 A. Philip Randolph in New York City is named in his honor
A. Philip Randolph Pullman Porter Museum is in Chicago's Pullman Historic District.
 Edward Waters College in Jacksonville, Florida houses a permanent exhibit on the life and accomplishments of A. Philip Randolph.
 Randolph Street, in Crescent City, Florida, was dedicated to him.
 A. Philip Randolph Library, at Borough of Manhattan Community College
 A. Philip Randolph Square park in Central Harlem was renamed to honor A. Philip Randolph in 1964 by the City Council.

Arts, entertainment, and media
 In the 2015 book The Road to Character author David Brooks includes him among the biographical sketches of individuals of good character
 In 1994 a PBS documentary A. Philip Randolph: For Jobs and Freedom
 In 2002, scholar Molefi Kete Asante listed A. Philip Randolph on his list of 100 Greatest African Americans.
 The story of the Brotherhood of Sleeping Car Porters was made into the 2002 Robert Townsend film 10,000 Black Men Named George starring Andre Braugher as A. Philip Randolph. The title refers to the demeaning custom of the time when Pullman porters, all of whom were black, were just addressed as "George" (short for "George's boys", a reference to Pullman Company founder George Pullman).
 A statue of A. Philip Randolph was erected in his honor in the concourse of Union Station in Washington, D.C..
 In 1986 a five-foot bronze statue on a two-foot pedestal of Randolph by Tina Allen was erected in Boston's Back Bay station.

Other
 James Farmer, co-founder of the Congress of Racial Equality (CORE), cited Randolph as one of his primary influences as a civil rights leader.
 Randolph was inducted into the Labor Hall of Honor in 1989.

See also
 List of civil rights leaders
 Milton P. Webster

Footnotes

Further reading

 Jervis Anderson, A. Philip Randolph: A Biographical Portrait. New York: Harcourt, Brace, Jovanovich, 1973.
 Thomas R. Brooks and A.H. Raskin, "A. Philip Randolph, 1889–1979", The New Leader, June 4, 1979, pp. 6–9.
 Daniel S. Davis, Mr. Black Labor: The Story of A. Philip Randolph, Father of the Civil Rights Movement. New York: Dutton, 1972.
 Paul Delaney, "A. Philip Randolph, Rights Leader, Dies: President Leads Tributes", New York Times, May 18, 1979, pg. B4.
 Andrew E. Kersten, A. Philip Randolph: A Life in the Vanguard. Rowman and Littlefield, 2006.
 Andrew E. Kersten and Clarence Lang (eds.), Reframing Randolph: Labor, Black Freedom, and the Legacies of A. Philip Randolph. New York: New York University Press, 2015.
 William H. Harris, "A. Philip Randolph as a Charismatic Leader, 1925–1941", Journal of Negro History, vol. 64 (1979), pp. 301–315.
 Paul Le Blanc and Michael Yates, A Freedom Budget for All Americans: Recapturing the Promise of the Civil Rights Movement in the Struggle for Economic Justice Today. with Michael D. Yates. New York: Monthly Review Press, 2013.
 Manning Marable, "A. Philip Randolph and the Foundations of Black American Socialism", Radical America, vol. 14 (March–April 1980), pp. 6–29.
 Paula F. Pfeffer, A. Philip Randolph, Pioneer of the Civil Rights Movement (1990; Louisiana State University Press, 1996). 
 Cynthia Taylor, A. Philip Randolph: The Religious Journey of An African American Labor Leader (NYU Press, 2006). 
 SUMMERVILLE, RAYMOND M. 2020. “Winning Freedom and Exacting Justice”: A. Philip Randolph's Use of Proverbs and Proverbial Language. Proverbium 37:281-310
 Sarah E. Wright, A. Philip Randolph: Integration in the Workplace (Silver Burdett Press, 1990),

External links

 
 A. Philip Randolph Pullman Porter Museum
 A. Philp Randolph Institute The Senior Constituency Group of the
 American Federation of Labor and Congress of Industrial Organizations (AFL-CIO)
 AFL-CIO Labor History Biography of Randolph
 
 A. Philip Randolph's FBI files, hosted at the Internet Archive
 Part 1
 Part 2
 A. Philip Randolph Collected Papers held by the Swarthmore College Peace Collection

Documentaries
 10,000 Black Men Named George entry from the Internet Movie Database
 A. Philip Randolph Exhibit at the George Meany Memorial Archives of the National Labor College.
 A. Philip Randolph: For Jobs and Freedom 86 minutes, Producer: WETA-TV. Director: Dante James. Distributor: California Newsreel

1889 births
1979 deaths
Activists for African-American civil rights
Activists from Florida
Activists from New York (state)
African-American trade unionists
American trade union leaders
American people in rail transportation
City College of New York alumni
Harlem Renaissance
Members of Social Democrats USA
Nonviolence advocates
People from Crescent City, Florida
People from Jacksonville, Florida
Presidential Medal of Freedom recipients
Socialist Party of America politicians from New York (state)
Spingarn Medal winners